The canton of Arpajon-sur-Cère is an administrative division of the Cantal department, southern France. Its borders were modified at the French canton reorganisation which came into effect in March 2015. Its seat is in Arpajon-sur-Cère.

It consists of the following communes:
 
Arpajon-sur-Cère
Cassaniouze
Junhac
Labesserette
Lacapelle-del-Fraisse
Ladinhac
Lafeuillade-en-Vézie
Lapeyrugue
Leucamp
Montsalvy
Prunet
Sansac-Veinazès
Sénezergues
Vieillevie

References

Cantons of Cantal